Night (also described as nighttime, unconventionally spelled as "nite") is the period of ambient darkness from sunset to sunrise during each 24-hour day, when the Sun is below the horizon. The exact time when night begins and ends depends on the location and varies throughout the year, based on factors such as season and latitude.

The word can be used in a different sense as the time between bedtime and morning. In common communication, it is a farewell (sometimes lengthened to "good night"), mainly when someone is going to sleep or leaving.

Astronomical night is the period between astronomical dusk and astronomical dawn when the Sun is between 18 and 90 degrees below the horizon and does not illuminate the sky. As seen from latitudes between about 48.56° and 65.73° north or south of the equator, complete darkness does not occur around the summer solstice because, although the Sun sets, it is never more than 18° below the horizon at lower culmination, −90° Sun angles occur at the Tropic of Cancer on the December solstice and Tropic of Capricorn on the June solstice, and at the equator on equinoxes. And as seen from latitudes greater than 72° north or south of the equator, complete darkness does not occur in both equinoxes because, although the Sun sets, it is never more than 18° below the horizon.

The opposite of night is day (or "daytime", to distinguish it from "day" referring to a 24-hour period). Twilight is the period of night after sunset or before sunrise when the Sun still illuminates the sky when it is below the horizon. At any given time, one side of Earth is bathed in sunlight (the daytime), while the other side is in darkness caused by Earth blocking the sunlight. The central part of the shadow is called the umbra, where the night is darkest.

Natural illumination at night is still provided by a combination of moonlight, planetary light, starlight, zodiacal light, gegenschein, and airglow. In some circumstances, aurorae, lightning, and bioluminescence can provide some illumination. The glow provided by artificial lighting is sometimes referred to as light pollution because it can interfere with observational astronomy and ecosystems.

Duration and geography

On Earth, an average night is shorter than daytime due to two factors. Firstly, the Sun's apparent disk is not a point, but has an angular diameter of about 32 arcminutes (32'). Secondly, the atmosphere refracts sunlight so that some of it reaches the ground when the Sun is below the horizon by about 34'. The combination of these two factors means that light reaches the ground when the center of the solar disk is below the horizon by about 50'. Without these effects, daytime and night would be the same length on both equinoxes, the moments when the Sun appears to contact the celestial equator. On the equinoxes, daytime actually lasts almost 14 minutes longer than night does at the equator, and even longer towards the poles.

The summer and winter solstices mark the shortest and longest nights, respectively. The closer a location is to either the North Pole or the South Pole, the wider the range of variation in the night's duration. Although daytime and night nearly equalize in length on the equinoxes, the ratio of night to day changes more rapidly at high latitudes than at low latitudes before and after an equinox. In the Northern Hemisphere, Denmark experiences shorter nights in June than India. In the Southern Hemisphere, Antarctica sees longer nights in June than Chile. Both hemispheres experience the same patterns of night length at the same latitudes, but the cycles are 6 months apart so that one hemisphere experiences long nights (winter) while the other is experiencing short nights (summer).

In the region within either polar circle, the variation in daylight hours is so extreme that part of summer sees a period without night intervening between consecutive days, while part of winter sees a period without daytime intervening between consecutive nights.

Beyond Earth

The phenomenon of day and night is due to the rotation of a celestial body about its axis, creating an illusion of the sun rising and setting. Different bodies spin at very different rates, some much faster than Earth and others extremely slowly, leading to very long days and nights. The planet Venus rotates once every 224.7 days – by far the slowest rotation period of any of the major planets. In contrast, the gas giant Jupiter's sidereal day is only 9 hours and 56 minutes. The length of a planet's orbital period determines the length of its day-night cycle as well - Venus has a rotation period of 224.7 days, but a day-night cycle just 116.75 days long due to its retrograde rotation and orbital motion around the Sun. Mercury has the longest day-night cycle as a result of its 3:2 resonance between its orbital period and rotation period - this resonance gives it a day-night cycle that is 176 days long. A planet may experience large temperature variations between day and night, such as Mercury, the planet closest to the sun. This is one consideration in terms of planetary habitability or the possibility of extraterrestrial life.

Effects on life

Biological
The disappearance of sunlight, the primary energy source for life on Earth, has dramatic effects on the morphology, physiology and behavior of almost every organism. Some animals sleep during the night, while other nocturnal animals, including moths and crickets, are active during this time. The effects of day and night are not seen in the animal kingdom aloneplants have also evolved adaptations to cope best with the lack of sunlight during this time. For example, crassulacean acid metabolism is a unique type of carbon fixation which allows some photosynthetic plants to store carbon dioxide in their tissues as organic acids during the night, which can then be used during the day to synthesize carbohydrates. This allows them to keep their stomata closed during the daytime, preventing transpiration of water when it is precious.

Social

The first constant electric light was demonstrated in 1835. As artificial lighting has improved, especially after the Industrial Revolution, nighttime activity has increased and become a significant part of the economy in most places. Many establishments, such as nightclubs, bars, convenience stores, fast-food restaurants, gas stations, distribution facilities, and police stations now operate 24 hours a day or stay open as late as 1 or 2 a.m. Even without artificial light, moonlight sometimes makes it possible to travel or work outdoors at night.

Nightlife is a collective term for entertainment that is available and generally more popular from the late evening into the early hours of the morning. It includes pubs, bars, nightclubs, parties, live music, concerts, cabarets, theatre, cinemas, and shows. These venues often require a cover charge for admission. Nightlife entertainment is often more adult-oriented than daytime entertainment.

Cultural and psychological

Night is often associated with danger and evil, because of the psychological connection of night's all-encompassing darkness to the fear of the unknown and darkness's hindrance of a major sensory system (the sense of sight). Nighttime is naturally associated with vulnerability and danger for human physical survival. Criminals, animals, and other potential dangers can be concealed by darkness. Midnight has a particular importance in human imagination and culture.

Upper Paleolithic art was found to show (by André Leroi-Gourhan) a pattern of choices where the portrayal of animals that were experienced as dangerous were located at a distance from the entrance of a cave dwelling at a number of different cave locations.

The belief in magic often includes the idea that magic and magicians are more powerful at night. Séances of spiritualism are usually conducted closer to midnight. Similarly, mythical and folkloric creatures such as vampires, ghosts and werewolves are described as more active at night. In almost all cultures, legendary stories warn of the night's dangers.

The cultural significance of the night in Islam differs from that in Western culture. The Quran was revealed during the Night of Power, the most significant night according to Islam. Muhammad made his famous journey from Mecca to Jerusalem and then to heaven in the night. Another prophet, Abraham, came to realize the supreme being in charge of the universe at night.

People who prefer nocturnal activity are called night owls.

See also 

Earth's shadow
Night aviation regulations in the US
Night sky
Nocturne
Olbers' paradox

Further reading

Culture

References

External links

Darkness
Night
Parts of a day
Time in astronomy